The 1988 United Jersey Bank Classic was a women's tennis tournament played on outdoor hard courts in Mahwah, New Jersey in the United States and was part of  the Category 3 tier of the 1988 WTA Tour. It was the 11th edition of the tournament and was held from August 22 through August 28, 1988. First-seeded Steffi Graf won the singles title, her second at the event after 1986, and earned $40,000 first-prize money.

Finals

Singles

 Steffi Graf defeated  Nathalie Tauziat 6–0, 6–1
 It was Graf's 8th singles title of the year and the 27th of her career.

Doubles

 Jana Novotná /  Helena Suková defeated  Gigi Fernández /  Robin White 6–3, 6–2
 It was Novotná's 6th title of the year and the 10th of her career. It was Suková's 4th title of the year and the 32nd of her career.

References

External links
 ITF tournament edition details

United Jersey Bank Classic
WTA New Jersey
United Jersey Bank Classic
United Jersey Bank Classic
United Jersey Bank Classic